Yiannis Gabriel is a Greek-British sociologist, best known for his contributions to the academic field of organisational storytelling.

Gabriel earned his Ph.D. in sociology in 1981 from UC Berkeley on a dissertation titled Freud and Society. Since 1989, he is affiliated with the University of Bath School of Management, where he since 2009 holds a chair in organisational theory. He has previously held professorships in organisational theory at Imperial College London and Royal Holloway, University of London.

References 

British sociologists
Academics of the University of Bath
Living people
University of California, Berkeley alumni
Year of birth missing (living people)